Studnica lake is a lake located in the Gwda Valley District, in the north-west part of Poland. Studnica lake is also the source of Gwda river.

There are four different Studnica lakes in Poland.

Lakes of Poland
Lakes of West Pomeranian Voivodeship